Perils of the Wilderness is a 1956 American Western serial film directed by Spencer Gordon Bennet and starring Dennis Moore.

Plot
U.S. Deputy Marshal Dan Lawson teams with RCMP Sergeant Gray to go undercover and capture the nefarious smuggler Bart Randall. Lawson, posing as an outlaw called Laramie, is ready to infiltrate the gang led by Randall, who is wanted for murder and bank robbery in the United States. In addition to the difficulties inherent in the mission, Lawson must deal with other issues, including the use of a fake totem and flying a hydra plane to awe the menacing Indians and renegade whites. He is aided in his search by Donna Blaine, who is suspected at first of giving information to Randall, but who is really a Canadian secret agent investigating Randall's illegal gun trading with the Indians.

Cast
 Dennis Moore as Deputy Marshal Dan Mason, a.k.a. Laramie
 Richard Emory as Sergeant Gray
 Evelyn Finley as Donna Blaine (as Eve Anderson)
 Kenneth MacDonald as Bart Randall (as Keeneth R. MacDonald)
 Rick Vallin as Little Bear
 John Elliott as Homer Lynch
 Don C. Harvey as Kruger
 Terry Frost as Batiste
 Al Ferguson as Mike
 Bud Osborne as Jake
 Rex Lease as Sergeant Jim Rodney
 Pierce Lyden as Amby
 John Mitchum as Brent

Chapter titles
 The Voice from the Sky
 The Mystery Plane
 The Mine of Menace
 Ambush for a Mountie
 Laramie's Desperate Chance
 Trapped in the Flaming Forest
 Out of the Trap
 Laramie Rides Alone
 Menace of the Medicine Man
 Midnight Marauders
 The Falls of Fate
 Rescue from the Rapids
 Little Bear Pays a Debt
 The Mystery Plane Flies Again
 Laramie Gets His Man

See also
List of American films of 1956

References

External links

Cinefania.com

1956 films
1956 Western (genre) films
American black-and-white films
1950s English-language films
Columbia Pictures film serials
Films directed by Spencer Gordon Bennet
Royal Canadian Mounted Police in fiction
Northern (genre) films
Films with screenplays by George H. Plympton
American Western (genre) films